The Râșca Mare is a right tributary of the river Someșul Rece in Romania. It discharges into the Someșul Rece downstream from the Cheile de la Arsuri, near Gilău.

References

Rivers of Romania
Rivers of Cluj County